Saint-Glen (Gallo: Saent-Glen) is a commune in the Côtes-d'Armor department of Brittany in northwestern France.

Population
People from Saint-Glen are called Glénois in French.

See also
 Communes of the Côtes-d'Armor department

References

External links

 Official website 

Communes of Côtes-d'Armor